Baron Kingsale is a title of the premier baron in the Peerage of Ireland. The feudal barony dates to at least the thirteenth century. The first peerage creation was by writ.

Name and precedence 
In the early times the name was "Kinsale" or "Kinsale and Ringrone", but the spelling Kingsale has imposed itself with time and Ringrone was dropped. Regarding its precedence among the Irish baronies, the title Baron Athenry was considered the eldest and Kingsale held the second rank. However, in 1799 Athenry became dormant (and probably extinct) and Kingsale was elevated to premier Baron in Ireland.

Numbering 
The literature usually numbers the successive barons to avoid confusion arising from the repetitions of the same names, such as Miles or John de Courcy in the long line of the barons of Kingsale. Two such schemes are in common use, often both are cited together, e.g. Almeric de Courcy 18th (or 23rd) Baron. The older scheme numbers all the barons starting with Miles de Courcy, who was granted the baronies of Kingsale and Ringrone by Henry III in 1223. This scheme dates from Lodge in 1754. An alternative numbering was introduced by Cokayne in 1929 with the second version of The Complete Peerage. It excludes the early barons, that it considers feudal, and starts with Miles, who died in 1344, accepted as the first peer. This article follows the older numbering, considered more common.

Hat trick 
The barons traditionally claimed the privilege of remaining covered (that is, wearing a hat) in the presence of the monarch. It was supposed to have been obtained from King John by John de Courcy and handed down to his heirs. As far as is known, the right has been exercised for the first time by Almeric de Courcy, 23rd Baron Kingsale before William III in 1692. His successor Gerald de Courcy, 24th Baron Kingsale repeated the hat trick before George I in 1720 and George II on 22 June 1727. The Eleventh Edition of the Encyclopædia Britannica, however, states that the privilege "is a legend without historic foundation".

Castles 
 Kilbrittain Castle once belonged to the De Courcys but was lost to Donal Gott MacCarthy, King of Desmond, whose son Donal Maol MacCarthy Reagh was the first King of Carbery and founder of the MacCarthy Reagh dynasty.
 Coolmain Castle
 Old Head Castle

Decline 
Despite the antiquity of the title, the family no longer retains its property or wealth, having supported the losing side in past conflicts. The 30th (or 35th) Baron, despite education at Stowe and the Universities of Paris and Salzburg, supported by his father's marriage to the daughter of a Yorkshire lanolin oil business owner, was, due to the later failure of that business amongst other things, an odd-job man and plumber, and died a resident of sheltered housing.

The person currently entitled to hold the title is Nevinson Mark de Courcy, who was born in 1958 and lives in Remuera, Auckland, New Zealand. He is or would be the 31st (or 36th) Baron, however, his name does not appear in the current Roll of the Peerage. Under the terms of the Royal Warrant of 2004, any person who succeeds to a Peerage must prove his or her succession and be placed on the Roll, otherwise, that person may not be recognised as a peer legally or in official documents in the United Kingdom.

Lists

Feudal Barons (before 1222) - incomplete 
Miles de courcy (summoned 1223)
Patrick de Courcy (died before 1261)
Miles de Courcy (died c. 1290)
John de Courcy (died 1291)

Barons Kingsale (c. 1340) 
Miles de Courcy, 6th Baron Kingsale (died 1344)
Miles de Courcy, 7th Baron Kingsale (died c. 1372)
John de Courcy, 8th Baron Kingsale (died c. 1390)
William de Courcy, 9th Baron Kingsale (died c. 1400)
Nicholas de Courcy, 10th Baron Kingsale (died c. 1410)
Patrick de Courcy, 11th Baron Kingsale (died c. 1449)
Nicholas de Courcy, 12th Baron Kingsale (died 1475)
James de Courcy, 13th Baron Kingsale (died 1499)
Edmund de Courcy, 14th Baron Kingsale (died c. 1505)
David de Courcy, 15th Baron Kingsale (died c. 1520)
John de Courcy, 16th Baron Kingsale (died 1535)
Gerald de Courcy, 17th Baron Kingsale (died 1599)
John de Courcy, 18th Baron Kingsale (died 1628)
Gerald de Courcy, 19th Baron Kingsale (died c. 1642)
Patrick de Courcy, 20th Baron Kingsale (died 1663?)
John de Courcy, 21st Baron Kingsale (died 1667)
Patrick de Courcy, 22nd Baron Kingsale (1659/60–1669)
Almeric de Courcy, 23rd Baron Kingsale (1665–1720)
Gerald de Courcy, 24th Baron Kingsale (1700–1759)
John de Courcy, 25th Baron Kingsale (c. 1717–1776)
John de Courcy, 26th Baron Kingsale (died 1822)
Thomas de Courcy, 27th Baron Kingsale (1774–1832)
John Stapleton de Courcy, 28th Baron Kingsale (1805–1847)
John Constantine de Courcy, 29th Baron Kingsale (1827–1865)
Michael Conrad de Courcy, 30th Baron Kingsale (1828–1874)
John Fitzroy de Courcy, 31st Baron Kingsale (1821–1890)
Michael William de Courcy, 32nd Baron Kingsale (1822–1895)
Michael Constantine de Courcy, 33rd Baron Kingsale (1855–1931)
Michael William Robert de Courcy, 34th Baron Kingsale (1882–1969)
John de Courcy, 35th Baron Kingsale (1941–2005)
Nevinson Mark de Courcy, 36th Baron Kingsale (born 1958, living in New Zealand)

The heir presumptive is Joseph Kenneth Charles de Courcy (1955), eldest son of Kenneth de Courcy

Notes and references

Notes

Citations

Sources

Books 

 
 
 
  – G to K (for Kingsale)
  – Hussey to Lincolnshire (Snippet view, for Kingsale)
  – Barons (Preview)
  – Viscounts, barons
  – (for Kilbrittain Castle)
  – Normans, English, Huguenots etc.

News 

 
 

Baronies in the Peerage of Ireland
Noble titles created in 1223
County Cork
1223 establishments in Ireland